Battle of San Carlos may refer to

 Battle of San Carlos (1813), near Chillán during the Chilean war of independence
 Battle of San Carlos (1817), in modern Argentina
 Battle of San Carlos (1982), in San Carlos Water during the Falklands war